Zhu Cong may refer to:
Zhu Cong (footballer), Chinese footballer who plays for Guangdong Sunray Cave.
Character from Jin Yong's wuxia novel The Legend of the Condor Heroes.